Jane Kennedy may refer to:

Jane Kennedy (courtier) (died 1589), Scottish courtier
Jane Kennedy (actress) (born 1964), Australian actress and comedian
Jane Kennedy (politician) (born 1958), British Labour Party Member of Parliament

See also
Jayne Kennedy (born 1951), American model, actress and sportscaster